Dunkuh (also Romanized as Dūnkūh; also known as Dūnak) is a village in Mian Band Rural District, in the Central District of Nur County, Mazandaran Province, Iran. At the 2006 census, its population was 20, in 7 families.

References 

Populated places in Nur County